Limonia hardyana or flightless crane fly is a rare, wingless fly living in leaf litter on Oʻahu.

Physical Description 
The Limonia hardyana has 6 long legs, tri-segmented body, and is wingless Sometimes mistaken for a mosquito.

Habitat 
The Limonia haryana was discovered on or near the summit of Koolau Mountains on Oahu in Hawaii.  This mountain range is 3,130 ft (960 meters) in elevation and is a dormant volcano, where it can be found living in the higher elevation bogs or leaf litter.  The reason the crane fly is flightless is because flying at high altitudes may pose a risk due to high winds.

Crane fly larvae are “benthic-dwelling” and take approximately two weeks to hatch.

Species Status 
Possibly extinct due to destruction of its habitat by boars or being eaten by other predatory insects.

Discovery 
The Limonia hardyana was discovered by George William Byers a professor of Entomology at the University of Kansas in 1985.  Byers was the curator of the Snow Entomology Division of the Biodiversity Institute of the University.  He continued to study crane flies until his passing in 2018.

Conservation 
May become endangered if manmade water deviations continue, thus eliminating and redirecting the streams and water flows where the Liminia hardiana lives.

References

Limoniidae
Insects of Hawaii
Insects described in 1985